Stolen Paradise also released as Adolescence is a 1940 youth film directed by Louis J. Gasnier and filmed in and around Coral Gables, Florida. Eleanor Hunt was married to producer George A. Hirliman.

Plot
Eighteen-year-old Richard Gordon is a student at St Francis boarding school and is looking forward to eventually being ordained a Roman Catholic priest.  His mentor Father O'Malley summons him with news that his father is remarrying (Richard's mother had died years ago) and wishes Richard to return home and study in a prestigious university.  Richard is not keen on leaving St. Francis but Fr. O'Malley advises him that he should see a bit of life before making his decision to enter the clergy.

Dick eventually falls in love with his stepsister who is ten years older than he is.  In the meantime he falls in with a fast crowd at his university and World War II is on the horizon....

Cast
 Leon Janney  ...  Richard 'Dick' Gordon  
 Eleanor Hunt  ...  Patricia Morrow  
 Esther Muir  ...  Mrs. Ellen Gordon  
 Wilma Francis  ...  Jerry Dean  
 Doris Blaine  ...  Mary Hodge  
 Herbert Fisher  ...  Father O'Malley  
 Roy Tracy  ...  Tom Trowbridge  
 Fred Nielsey  ...  Robert Gordon  
 Mamie Smith  ...  Martha  
 Charles Shaw  ...  Larry Hodge  
 Billy Vines  ...  Salesman on Train  
 Gilda Lynch  ...  Janet

References

External links
 

1940 films
Films shot in Florida
Films set in Florida
American black-and-white films
Films about Catholicism
Monogram Pictures films
Films directed by Louis J. Gasnier
1940s exploitation films
World War II films made in wartime
1940 drama films
American war drama films
1940s high school films
1940s English-language films